La Guzmán is a live album by Mexican singer Alejandra Guzmán. It was released in 1997. Guzmán sang Live in Xcaret, a Mexican eco-tourism park on the Mayan Riviera. Coincidentally, on April 30, 2007, Paulina Rubio wed Spanish public relations executive, Nicolas Vallejo Najera "Colate", in the same place.

Track listing
 "Mala Hierba"   (C. Sanchez; C. Valle; Marina Lima)
 "Eternamente Bella"  (Myra Stella Turner)
 "Angeles Caídos" (J.R. Florez; C. Valle)
 "Loca"  (Myra Stella Turner)
 "Mírala, Míralo"  (J.R. Florez; Gian Pietro Felisatti)
 "Guante De Seda"  (José Vaca Flores; Miguel Blasco)
 "Hacer Él Amor Con Otro"  (Consuelo Arango; Gian Pietro Felisatti)
 "Despertar"  (C. Sanchez; C. Valle)
 "Set Acústico: Llama Por Favor/Rosas Rojas/Cuidado con el Corazón" 
 "Te Esperaba" (J.R. Florez; Gian Pietro Felisatti)
 "Dime Adiós"  (J.R. Florez; Cesar Valle)
 "No Hay Vacuna Contra el Amor"  (Adrian Posse; E.Paz.)
 "Reina De Corazones"  (J.R. Florez)
 "Corazones Rotos"  (C. Sanchez; C. Valle)
 "Mentiras"  (Miguel Mateos)
 "Hey Güera"  (J.R. Florez; Gian Pietro Felisatti)

Singles

Alejandra Guzmán live albums
1997 live albums